

Arts
 Yvonne Chouteau, Shawnee prima ballerina
 Oscar Jacobson, painter, curator, author, educator
 Mary Leader, poet
 America Meredith, Cherokee Nation art writer, artist, and curator
 Ravi Rajan, artist, musician, educator
 Jeri Redcorn, Caddo/Potawatomi potter
 Lynn Riggs, Cherokee playwright
 Susan Stryker, professor, author, filmmaker
 Julie Ann Ward, professor, author, poet laureate of Norman

Business
Clay Bennett, majority owner of the Oklahoma City Thunder
Pat Bowlen, owner of the Denver Broncos
Archie W. Dunham, oil and gas CEO
Roy Furr, founder of Furr's grocery store and cafeteria chain
Michael F. Price, mutual fund investor
Helen Walton, widow of Sam Walton

Film and television
Candy Clark, actress
Jack Garner, actor
James Garner (1928-2014), actor of television series Maverick and The Rockford Files and the movies The Great Escape and The Americanization of Emily. There is a 10-foot bronze statue of Garner as Bret Maverick in Norman.
Ed Harris, actor
Owen Joyner, actor
Christian Kane, actor
Hoda Kotb, journalist and anchor of NBC's Today
Sharron Miller, television director, writer, producer
Nyambi Nyambi, actor
Megyn Price, actress

Music
Broncho, rock band
Chainsaw Kittens, rock band
Yolanda Kondonassis, harpist
Jesse Ed Davis, guitarist
The Flaming Lips, rock band
Vince Gill, country and bluegrass performer

Politics
Carl Albert, late Speaker of the United States House of Representatives 
David Boren, Democratic U.S. Senator, Oklahoma Governor; University of Oklahoma President
Jake Files, Republican member of the Arkansas State Senate from Fort Smith, Arkansas, since 2011; born in Norman in 1972
Susanna M. Salter, moved to Norman following her service as the first woman mayor in the United States in Argonia, Kansas.
Elizabeth Warren, Democratic U.S. Senator

Print
Angie Debo, historian
Linda Hogan, author, academic, environmentalist
George Miksch Sutton, ornithologist, painter, author

Radio
Mary Jo Heath, host of the Metropolitan Opera radio broadcasts

Sports
Christopher Bell, race car driver
Sam Bradford, football player
Ryan Broyles, football player
Dominic Cervi, football (soccer) player
Nadia Comaneci, gymnast
Bart Conner, gymnast
Jordan Evans, NFL linebacker (Bengals)
Blake Griffin, NBA forward (Nets)
Charlie Kolar, football tight end (Iowa State Cyclones)
Daniel McCutchen, MLB pitcher (Pirates)
Jim Ross, former WCW and WWE (Hall of Fame) wrestling commentator, and executive; current AEW commentator and executive
Travis Simpson, football player
Barry Switzer, football coach
Zac Taylor, head coach of the NFL's Cincinnati Bengals
Bud Wilkinson, football coach
Trae Young, professional basketball player for the Atlanta Hawks
Lindy Waters III,  NBA player

Others
Anita Hill, law professor (lived in Norman and worked at OU during the Clarence Thomas confirmation hearings)
Fred Haise, astronaut, circled the Moon on Apollo 13
Donna J. Nelson, OU chemistry professor, 2016 ACS President, and science advisor to Breaking Bad
Charles Thayer, Muscogee Creek Nation
Alpharad, YouTuber, esports personality and musician.

References

 
Norman
Norman, Oklahoma